Tangestan may refer to:
 Tangestan, Fereydunshahr, Isfahan Province
 Tangestan, Nain, Isfahan Province
 Tangestan, Khuzestan
 Tangestan County, in Bushehr Province